KUVR (1380 AM) is a radio station broadcasting an classic hits music format. Licensed to Holdrege, Nebraska, United States, the station is currently owned by Nebraska Rural Radio Association.

History
KUVR was founded by Bill and Betty Rae Whitlock and went on the air October 22, 1956. It has occupied the same building in downtown Holdrege since 1958, which was previously occupied by Northwestern Bell Telephone Co.  In 1971, an FM station was added, KUVR-FM (later separated from KUVR, now KMTY).

Ownership
In May 2013, Armada Media traded KUVR and KMTY to Legacy Broadcasting in exchange for stations in Scottsbluff and North Platte. The transaction was consummated on October 11, 2013, with Legacy's purchase price pegged at $800,000.

Effective January 17, 2020, Legacy Communications sold KUVR, translator K245CK, and six sister stations to Nebraska Rural Radio Association for $1.75 million.

References

External links

Classic hits radio stations in the United States
UVR
Phelps County, Nebraska
Radio stations established in 1956
1956 establishments in Nebraska